José Anibal Laureano Colón (born June 24, 1958) is a retired Puerto Rican professional wrestler and manager. He is better known by his ring name, Chicky Starr. He's currently the general manager of the International Wrestling Association (IWA) of Puerto Rico.

Professional wrestling career

Early career (1975–1985)
Starr formed a tag team with Antonio Pantojas known as the Peron Brothers for Stampede Wrestling in Canada. They wrestled as heels from 1981-82 in Stampede. Starr often wrestled as a mid-card wrestler and in the opening matches at house shows.

From 1984 to mid 1985, Starr performed in San Antonio's Southwest Championship Wrestling (SCW). On September 9, 1984 he and Brett Sawyer won the SCW Southwest Tag Team Championship from The Fabulous Blonds (Eric Embry and Dan Greer) but dropped the belts back to The Fabulous Blonds on October 9. Starr also won the SCW Southwest Junior Heavyweight Championship from Embry, but later lost it to Ron Sexton.

World Wrestling Council (1985–1991, 1995–1997, 1998–2000, 2002–present)
In late 1985, Starr appeared in Puerto Rico World Wrestling Council (WWC). He became a villain when he accused his mentor El Invader #1 of holding him back. Starr challenged Invader #1 to a match, during which he attacked his mentor with a steel chair. Starr and Invader #1 feuded from the mid 1980s through the early 1990s. They competed in a "Retirement vs. Hair" match won by Invader #1 at the 1987 WWC Anniversary card. This feud ended in 1991 when Starr left the WWC to start a new promotion called the American Wrestling Federation (AWF) with Hercules Ayala, former WWC announcer Hugo Savinovich and Gloria Uribe.

Starr also became a manager and in early 1986, starting a faction initially known as El Club Deportivo (The Sports Club). He recruited Victor Rodriguez as his bodyguard. He also managed his kayfabe cousin Ron Starr. Other members of his group were Abdullah the Butcher, Al Perez, Sadistic Steve Strong, and Manny Fernandez. They feuded with El Invader #1 and Carlos Colon. In 1988, Starr defeated Rufus R. Jones to win the King of Wrestling crown.

The feud with Invader #1 resumed in 1997 when Starr returned to WWC. He teamed with Invader #2 who had turned against Invader #1 earlier that year. Starr briefly made an alliance with Invader #1 that only lasted a couple of weeks before they started feuding again. The same year, Starr created a new alliance called Starr Corporation with Victor the Bodyguard Rodriguez and Angel Rodriguez. Starr merged Starr Corporation with Ray Gonzalez's Familia del Milenio in the late 1990s and early 2000s.

Starr won the WWC Universal Championship when he defeated Carlito in San Lorenzo, Puerto Rico in early 2003. In 2011 Starr defeated Invader #1 in a "Hair vs Hair" match. Also Chicky was a manager and was considered as the most important manager of Puerto Rico wrestling history and of the best around the world. With his stable named The Sports Club, Chicky was the official manager in WWC of names like Abdullah the Butcher, Stan Hansen, Bruiser Brody, Ron Starr, Al Pérez, Kareem Mohammed, Grizzly Boone, Jason the Terrible, Joe Leduc, Hercules Ayala, "Sadistic" Steve Strong, "Nature Boy" Buddy Landell, Ronnie Garvin, Harley Race, "The Raging Bull" Manny Fernández, Leo Burke, The Sheeperders, The Wild Samoans (Afa and Sika), The Samoan Swat Team, The Polynesian Prince, The Alaskan Hunters, Korsita Korchenko, Tama the Islander, Dandy Dan Kroffatt, Scott Hall, Abuda Dein, The Iron Sheik, Killer Khalifa, Invader#2, Crash the Eliminator (a.k.a. Hugh Morris), The Skywalker, Hurricane Castillo Jr., Victor the Bodyguard, "Dirty" Dutch Mantell, Ricky Banderas, Tower of Doom, Shane the Glamour Boy, "Mr.Ray-tings" Ray Gonzalez, Steve Corino, "The Precious One" Gilbert, Black Pain, The Sons of Samoa, Los Renegados del Infierno, Thunder and Lightning, Migthy Ursus, among others.

Other promotions
In the International Wrestling Association (IWA), the Starr Corporation was composed of Pain, Víctor "The Bodyguard" Rodriguez, Angel Rodriguez, AAA/TNA's "El Mesias" Ricky Banderas and Dutch Mantell. They feuded with Savio Vega, Shane The Glamour Boy, Los Malcriaos (Miguel Perez, Jr. and Huracan Castillo, Jr.). Starr and Victor "The Bodyguard" Rodriguez also wrestled as a tag team version of Starr Corporation and were IWA World Tag Team Champions.

Personal life
Starr's oldest son is Puerto Rican boxer José Laureano who won a silver medal at the 1993 Central American and Caribbean Games. Starr owns his own brand of coquito that he sells during Christmas called "Coquito Chickystariano".

Championships and accomplishments
International Wrestling Association
IWA Hardcore Championship (1 time)
IWA World Tag Team Championship (6 times) – with Victor the Bodyguard
Pro Wrestling Illustrated
 PWI ranked him #245 of the top 500 singles wrestlers in the PWI 500 in 1998
Southwest Championship Wrestling
SCW Southwest Tag Team Championship (1 time) – with Brett Sawyer
SCW Southwest Junior Heavyweight Championship (2 times)
Top Heavyweight Wrestling Promotions
THWP Caribbean Tag Team Championship (1 time) – with Ángelo Rivera
World Wrestling Council
WWC Caribbean Tag Team Championship (1 time) – with Leo Burke
WWC North American Tag Team Championship (2 times) – with Ron Starr
WWC Television Championship (1 time)
WWC Universal Heavyweight Championship (1 time)
WWC World Junior Heavyweight Championship (3 times)
WWC World Tag Team Championship (7 times) – with Ron Starr (2), Victor the Bodyguard (1), Huracán Castillo (3) and Alex Montalvo (1)

Luchas de Apuestas record

See also
Professional wrestling in Puerto Rico

References

External links

1958 births
Living people
People from Vega Baja, Puerto Rico
Puerto Rican male professional wrestlers
Professional wrestling announcers
Professional wrestling managers and valets
Stampede Wrestling alumni
20th-century professional wrestlers
21st-century professional wrestlers
WWC Universal Heavyweight Champions